Drug Discovery Today is a monthly peer-reviewed scientific journal that is published by Elsevier. It was established in 1996 and publishes reviews on all aspects of preclinical drug discovery from target identification and validation through hit identification, lead identification and optimisation, to candidate selection.

In 2004, the Drug Discovery Today journal series expanded with the launch of four online-only review journals: Drug Discovery Today: Disease Mechanisms, Drug Discovery Today: Disease Models, Drug Discovery Today: Therapeutic Strategies, and Drug Discovery Today: Technologies. The four journals cover developments across the breadth of therapeutic areas and technologies relevant to the drug discovery and development pipeline. However, as of 2022, these titles have been discontinued and incorporated back into Drug Discovery Today.

According to the Journal Citation Reports, the journal has a 2021 impact factor of 8.369.

See also
Trends in Pharmacological Sciences

References

External links 
 
 

Elsevier academic journals
Pharmacology journals
Monthly journals
English-language journals
Publications established in 1996
Academic journal series